The FIBT World Championships 1975 took place in Cervinia, Italy for the second time, hosting the event previously in 1971.

Two man bobsleigh

Four man bobsleigh

Medal table

References
2-Man bobsleigh World Champions
4-Man bobsleigh World Champions

IBSF World Championships
1975 in bobsleigh
International sports competitions hosted by Italy
Bobsleigh in Italy 
1958 in Italian sport